Kumiva Peak is an  summit located in Pershing County, Nevada, United States.

Description
Kumiva Peak is the highest peak of the Selenite Range which is a subset of the Great Basin Ranges. This peak is set in the Mount Limbo Wilderness Study Area which is administered by the Bureau of Land Management. This landform's toponym has been officially adopted by the U.S. Board on Geographic Names, and has appeared in publications since at least 1877.

Climate
Kumiva Peak is set within the Great Basin Desert which has hot summers and cold winters. The desert is an example of a cold desert climate as the desert's elevation makes temperatures cooler than lower elevation deserts. Due to the high elevation and aridity, temperatures drop sharply after sunset. Summer nights are comfortably cool. Winter highs are generally above freezing, and winter nights are bitterly cold, with temperatures often dropping well below freezing.

See also
 List of mountain peaks of Nevada
 Great Basin

References

External links
 Weather forecast: Kumiva Peak
 National Geodetic Survey Data Sheet

Mountains of Pershing County, Nevada
Mountains of Nevada
North American 2000 m summits
Mountains of the Great Basin